Mongolia competed at the 1968 Winter Olympics in Grenoble, France.

Biathlon

Men

 1 One minute added per close miss (a hit in the outer ring), two minutes added per complete miss.

Cross-country skiing

Men

Speed skating

Men

References 
 Official Olympic Reports
 Olympic Winter Games 1968, full results by sports-reference.com

Nations at the 1968 Winter Olympics
1968 Winter Olympics
Oly